Volleyball at the 2013 Pacific Mini Games was held at Kafika Hall. Competition took place from 3 to 11 September 2013.

Medal table

Medal summary

References

2013 Pacific Mini Games
2013 in volleyball
2013 Mini